US Thrill Rides is an entertainment design and consulting company in Orlando, Florida. It is best known for creating thrill rides in several US locations.

History
In 1992, William Kitchen and Ken Bird invented the SkyCoaster. Kitchen founded Sky Fun I Inc. that same year to sell the product to amusement parks.  Canadian firm ThrillTime Entertainment International purchased the company for $12 million in mid-1998, renaming it SkyCoaster Inc. All 12 employees kept their jobs, with Kitchen remaining linked to the company as a consultant.

Kitchen's next invention was that of the SkyVenture, sold under SkyVenture, LLC. The first installation opened across from Wet 'n Wild Orlando on International Drive in July 1998. The attraction received a visit by George H. W. Bush.

Kitchen next founded US Thrill Rides. US Thrill Rides has since developed the UniCoaster flat rides and SkyQuest transport rides, as well as the SkySpire and Polercoaster (in collaboration with Intamin).

On December 21, 2022, US Thrill Rides filed for Chapter 11 bankruptcy.

Products and technologies 
US Thrill Rides specializes in amusement rides and attractions.

Polercoaster 

Polercoaster is an amusement ride offered as a joint venture by US Thrill Rides and Intamin. An installation consists of a large tower structure which features glass elevators to an observation deck, as well as an El Loco steel roller coaster wrapping around the tower. The model was first introduced in 2012. US Thrill Rides' Bill and Michael Kitchen invented the concept to allow amusement parks with little available space to be able to design a full-size roller coaster. By November, 2014 Kitchen had licensed the Florida rights for his invention to Skyplex where it was announced the first Polercoaster would be the tallest rollercoaster in the world, (called the "Skyscraper") and would be built by 2017. The Skyplex project is still claimed to be moving forward but has not yet broken ground and was not opened in 2020 as previously claimed by the developer.

SkyQuest 
SkyQuest is a people mover introduced in 2010. The cable-car style ride utilizes covered platforms and gondolas to move rides either around the track or from one platform to another.

SkySpire 
SkySpire is an amusement ride offered by US Thrill Rides. An installation consists of a large tower structure which features glass elevators to an observation deck, as well as a ride featuring fully enclosed gondolas wrapping around the tower in the shape of a double helix. Skyspire was chosen as one of the five finalists to anchor the San Diego Bay revitalization project. Skyspire won the contract with 1HWY1 who took primary ownership of redesigning the initial concept and implementation, but encountered numerous obstacles that have hindered development to the present day.

SkyView 
The wheel itself does not turn like a conventional Ferris wheel, instead a chain-like mechanism is used to move the gondolas around the structure, which could be constructed in shapes other than the traditional circle. No SkyView rides have yet been built.

UniCoaster 
UniCoaster is an amusement ride with a small footprint designed to mimic the experience of a looping roller coaster. The design was licensed exclusively to Chance Rides until 2020 when Kitchen cancelled the exclusivity and began marketing variations such as "Unicoaster Roulette" to casinos in an attempt to mitigate the financial impact of the COVID-19  theme park shutdown.

Notable installations

References

External links 

 

Amusement ride manufacturers
Roller coaster manufacturers
Manufacturing companies based in Florida
Companies based in Orlando, Florida
Companies that filed for Chapter 11 bankruptcy in 2022